Tago Mago is the second studio album by the German krautrock band Can, originally released as a double LP in August 1971 on the United Artists label. It was the band's first album to feature Damo Suzuki after the 1970 departure of previous vocalist Malcolm Mooney. Recorded in a rented castle near Cologne, the album features long-form experimental tracks blending rock improvisation, funk rhythms and musique concrète techniques.

Tago Mago has been described as Can's best and most extreme record in sound and structure. The album has received widespread critical acclaim and is cited as an influence by various artists. Drowned in Sound called it "arguably the most influential rock album ever recorded."

Recording and production

After Malcolm Mooney left Can in 1970, the band was left without a vocalist. Bassist Holger Czukay met Kenji "Damo" Suzuki, who was busking outside a cafe in Munich, and invited him to join the band. That evening, Suzuki performed with the band at the Blow Up Club and subsequently became a member of Can.

Tago Mago was recorded by Czukay at Schloss Nörvenich, a castle near Cologne, between November 1970 and February 1971. Early in 1968, the band had been invited to stay rent-free at the castle for one year by art collector Christoph Vohwinkel, who had rented the castle with the idea of transforming it into an art center.

Recording took three months to complete, with sessions often lasting up to 16 hours a day. Czukay would edit the long, disorganized jams into structured songs. He used only two two-track tape recorders to capture the sessions. Because of the limits of two-track recording, the group favored the castle's high-ceilinged entrance hall, an architectural reverb chamber, using the natural acoustics and placing the microphones optimally relative to their instruments. Because of the intense reverberation, Czukay took advantage of the sonic bleed and limited the band to three microphones, shared between vocalist Damo Suzuki and drummer Jaki Liebezeit. Keyboardist Irmin Schmidt experimented with sine-wave generators and oscillators in place of typical synthesizers on "Aumgn."

Tago Mago was the first Can album to be composed of not only regularly recorded music but combined "in-between" recordings, for which Czukay secretly recorded the musicians jamming during pre-production sessions. He also captured in-between recordings of the shouts of a child who mistakenly entered the room during recording as well as the howling of Vohwinkel's dog.

According to Czukay, the album was named after Illa de Tagomago, an island off the east coast of Ibiza.

It was originally released in Germany as a double LP in August 1971 by United Artists Records. The British release, with different artwork, ensued in February 1972.

Music

Tago Mago saw Can changing to a jazzier and more experimental sound than with previous recordings, with longer instrumental interludes and fewer vocals; this shift was caused by the dramatic difference between Suzuki and the band's more dominant former singer Mooney. Can took sonic inspiration from sources as diverse as jazz musicians such as Miles Davis and from electronic avant-garde music. The album was also inspired by the occultist Aleister Crowley, which is reflected through its dark sound and in its title. It is named for Illa de Tagomago, an island that features in the Crowley legend, and the title of the track "Aumgn" comes from Crowley's reference to the hindu mantra syllable Om. Czukay reflects that the album was "an attempt in achieving a mystery musical world from light to darkness and return." The group has referred to the album as their "magic record." The tracks have been described as having an "air of mystery and forbidden secrets."

Tago Mago is divided into two LPs, the first of which is more conventional and structured and the second more experimental and avant-garde. Roni Sarig, author of The Secret History of Rock called the second LP "as close as it ever got to avant-garde noise music." Featuring Czukay’s tape and radio experiments, the tracks "Aumgn" and "Peking O" have led music critics to surmise that Tago Mago is Can's "most extreme record in terms of sound and structure." "Peking O" made early use of a drum machine, an Ace Tone Rhythm Ace, combined with acoustic drumming. "Aumgn" features keyboardist Irmin Schmidt chanting rather than Suzuki's vocals. The closing track, "Bring Me Coffee or Tea," was described by Raggett as a "coda to a landmark record."

The side-long track "Halleluhwah" on the first album was shortened from 18½ to 3½ minutes for the B-side of the single "Turtles Have Short Legs," a novelty song recorded during the Tago Mago sessions and released by Liberty Records in 1971. A different, 5½-minute shortened version of "Halleluhwah" would later appear on the compilation Cannibalism in 1978 while the single's A-side remained out of print until its inclusion on 1992's Cannibalism 2.

Reception and legacy

Tago Mago has been critically acclaimed and is credited with pioneering various modern musical styles. Raggett called Tago Mago a "rarity of the early '70s, a double album without a wasted note." Many critics, particularly in the UK, were eager to praise the album, and by the end of 1971 Can played their first show in the UK.

Julian Cope wrote in Krautrocksampler that Tago Mago "sounds only like itself, like no-one before or after" and described the lyrics as delving "below into the Unconscious." Dummy called it "a genre-defining work of psychedelic, experimental rock music." Critic Simon Reynolds described the record's sound as "shamanic avant-funk."

Influence 
Various artists have cited Tago Mago as an influence on their work. John Lydon of the Sex Pistols and Public Image Ltd. called it "stunning" in his autobiography Rotten: No Irish, No Blacks, No Dogs. Bobby Gillespie of Jesus and Mary Chain and Primal Scream said: "The music was like nothing I'd ever heard before, not American, not rock & roll but mysterious and European." Mark Hollis of Talk Talk called Tago Mago "an extremely important album" and an inspiration for his own Laughing Stock. Marc Bolan listed Suzuki's freeform lyricism as an inspiration. Jonny Greenwood and Thom Yorke of Radiohead cite the album as an early influence.

There have been attempts by several artists to play cover versions of songs from Tago Mago. The Flaming Lips album In a Priest Driven Ambulance contains a song called "Take Meta Mars," an attempt to cover the song "Mushroom." However, as the band members had only heard the song once and did not possess a copy of it, the song is only similar-sounding and not a proper cover. The Jesus and Mary Chain have covered the song live and included it on the CD version of Barbed Wire Kisses. The Fall, led by lifelong Can enthusiast Mark E. Smith, recorded a song indebted to the Tago Mago track "Oh Yeah" entitled "I Am Damo Suzuki" for 1985's This Nation's Saving Grace.

Remix versions of several Tago Mago tracks by various artists are included on the album Sacrilege.

Accolades 
Tago Mago is listed in the book 1001 Albums You Must Hear Before You Die, which states: "Even after 30 years Tago Mago sounds refreshingly contemporary and gloriously extreme." Acclaimed Music ranks it as the 243rd most-acclaimed album of all time.

Track listing

Personnel

Damo Suzuki – vocals
Holger Czukay – bass, engineering, editing
Michael Karoli – guitar, violin
Jaki Liebezeit – drums, double bass, piano
Irmin Schmidt – organ, electric piano, oscillators; vocals on "Aumgn"

Production
U. Eichberger – original artwork & design
Andreas Torkler – design (2004 rerelease)

References

Further reading
 
  ePDF and ePub editions are also available.

External links

1971 albums
Can (band) albums
United Artists Records albums